The City of Frankston (officially known as Frankston City Council) is a local government area (LGA) in Victoria, Australia in the southern suburbs of Melbourne. It has an area of 130 square kilometres, and in June 2018, the City of Frankston recorded a population of 141,845.

Despite its similar area and name, the City of Frankston is a different entity to the former City of Frankston which existed from 1966 until 1994, which was a continuation of the former Shire of Frankston and was abolished under state government reforms. This is similar to the situation for the Shire of South Gippsland and Shire of Glenelg, but is unlike the City of Melbourne, City of Knox, City of Whittlesea and City of Melton, whose administrations stayed intact through the amalgamations of the early 1990s.

Geography

The City is located on the eastern shores of Port Phillip, and is bounded on the north by the City of Kingston and the City of Greater Dandenong, on the east by the City of Casey, and on the south by the Shire of Mornington Peninsula. The boundaries of the City are defined largely on the north by Eel Race Road and Thompsons Road, on the east by the Dandenong-Hastings Road, and on the south by a complex boundary featuring Baxter-Tooradin Road, Golf Links Road and Humphries Road.

History

The City of Frankston was created in 1994 out of the remains of three abolished councils — all but the suburb of Mount Eliza from the former City of Frankston; the suburbs of Carrum Downs, Langwarrin and Skye from the City of Cranbourne; and part of Carrum Downs from the City of Springvale.

The major part of the City was first incorporated in 1860 as the Mornington Roads District, which became a shire in 1871 and was renamed Shire of Frankston and Hastings in 1893, losing its western riding to form the Shire of Mornington, which has since been amalgamated into the Shire of Mornington Peninsula. On 19 October 1960, the Shire of Frankston and Hastings split in two, with the western part remaining as the Shire of Frankston, and the eastern part being incorporated as the Shire of Hastings.

Frankston was officially proclaimed as a City on 24 August 1966.

In 1993 the state government announced a major statewide program of local government amalgamations, most of which took effect on 15 December 1994. Most councils and their LGA's were abolished with new ones being created to replace them.

Some changes occurred between the release of the Local Government Board report in July and the actual amalgamation — the original plan was to merge with the City of Chelsea and take Braeside and Carrum Downs from the City of Springvale. However, Frankston City Council submitted that it should expand eastwards instead, as well as taking Mount Eliza and Baxter. By October, the present boundaries had been agreed upon, but the new entity was to be known as the City of Nepean. This appeared in the Board's final report in November 1994. However, the State Government ultimately decided to use the old name for the new entity, departing from the Board's recommendation.

Council

The current council, as of November 2020, in order of election, is:

Mayors
The following Frankston councillors have served as mayor since the inaugural elections in 1997:

 1997-1998 Wayne Woods
 1998-1999 Wiliam Parkin
 1999-2000 David-Jon Dawn
 2000-2001 Mark Conroy
 2001-2003 Cathy Wilson
 2003-2004 Barry Priestly
 2004-2005 Rochelle McCarther
 2005-2006 Vicki McClelland
 2006-2007 Glenn Aitken
 2007-2008 Alistair Wardle
 2008-2009 Colin Hampton
 2009-2010 Christine Richards
 2010-2011 Kris Bolam JP
 2011-2012 Brian Cunial
 2012-2013 Sandra Mayer
 2013-2014 Darrel Taylor
 2014-2015 Sandra Mayer
 2015-2016 James Dooley
 2016-2017 Brian Cunial
 2017-2018 Colin Hampton
 2018-2019 Michael O'Reilly
 2019-2020 Sandra Mayer 
 2020-2021 Kris Bolam JP 
 2021-2022 Nathan Conroy
 2022-2023 Nathan Conroy

Townships and localities
The 2021 census, the city had a population of 139,281 up from 134,143 in the 2016 census

^ - Territory divided with another LGA

Wards
Ratepayers within the municipality are represented by elected city councillors. In the 2005 elections, held on 26 November 2005, where the previous single-councillor ward system was replaced with three, multi-councillor wards. These wards are known as North-West Ward (covering mostly Seaford, Frankston North and parts of Frankston), South-West Ward (covering the southern parts of Frankston and Frankston South) and East Ward (covering Langwarrin and Carrum Downs). Voting is compulsory and conducted by postal ballot, and is based on a preferential voting system.

Elections were last held in October 2020, and councillors were elected for a four-year term. Current councillors are:

 North West Ward: Steven Hughes, Kris Bolam JP and Sue Baker
 North East Ward: Nathan Conroy, David Asker and Suzette Tayler
 South Ward: Brad Hill, Claire Harvey and Liam Hughes

Facilities 
Notable facilities/locations within the LGA include;

 Peninsula Aquatic and Recreation Centre or PARC; a $49.7 million aquatic facility constructed in 2014 owned wholly by the Frankston City Council
 Frankston Park; known commercially as Skybus Stadium, is a suburban Australian rules football ground located in Frankston, Victoria, in Australia. It is home to the Frankston Football Club, which plays in the Victorian Football League. It is also the location of the first ever Australian Scout Jamboree in 1935 attendees by Lord Robert Baden-Powell
 Robinsons Reserve; The home of Frankston Softball Association and Frankston Tomatoes Baseball Club located in Frankston South
 Jubilee Park; a 13ha site in Frankston currently hosting both community cricket and Football clubs
 Ballam Park; 30 hectares of open areas and sporting fields including a premier athletics track which is home to the Frankston Little Athletics Club, AFL, soccer and cricket. It also The Park is also home to Ballam Park Homestead, an historic home and museum from the 1850s run by the Frankston Historical Society.
 Frankston Arts Centre; a purpose-built 800 seat performing and visual arts venue designed by renowned Australian Architect, Daryl Jackson, it was opened in 1995 by then Prime Minister, the Hon. Paul Keating.

Sister Cities
  Susono, in Shizuoka, Japan (established in 1982)
  Wuxi, in Jiangsu Province, China (established in 2011)
  Suva, in Rewa Province, Fiji (established in 2021)

See also

 City of Frankston (former)
 List of places on the Victorian Heritage Register in the City of Frankston
Mornington Peninsula and Western Port Biosphere Reserve

References

Frankston population data - page 36

External links
 

Metlink local public transport map
Link to Land Victoria interactive maps

Local government areas of Melbourne
Greater Melbourne (region)
 
1994 establishments in Australia
Populated places established in 1994